In Russia, efforts to build communism began after Tsar Nicholas II lost his power during the February Revolution, which started in 1917, and ended with the dissolution of the USSR in 1991. The Provisional Government was established under the liberal and social-democratic government; however, the Bolsheviks refused to accept the government and revolted in October 1917, taking control of Russia. Vladimir Lenin, their leader, rose to power and governed between 1917 and 1924.

The Communist Party of the Russian Federation remains the second largest political party after United Russia.

Russian Revolution

February Revolution

The First World War placed an unbearable strain on Russia's weak government and economy, resulting in mass shortages and hunger. In the meantime, the mismanagement and failures of the war turned the people and importantly, the soldiers against the Tsar, whose decision to take personal command of the army seemed to make him personally responsible for the defeats. In February 1917, the Tsar first lost control of the streets, then of the soldiers, and finally of the Duma, resulting in his forced abdication on 2 March 1917

On 26 February 1917, citywide strikes spread throughout Petrograd. Dozens of demonstrators were killed by troops. The crowds grew hostile, so the soldiers had to decide which side they were on. As the situation became critical, soldiers refused to work for the Tsar. On 26 February 1917, The Army abandoned the Tsar; the soldiers mutinied and refused to put down the riots.

By 27 February 1917, the workers were in control of the entire city.

October Revolution

On 24–25 October 1917, the Bolsheviks and Left Socialist Revolutionaries organized a revolution, occupying government buildings, telegraph stations, and other strategic points. On 24 October 1917, the Red Guards took over bridges and telephone exchanges. On 25 and 26 October 1917, the Red Guards took over banks, government buildings, and railways stations. The cruiser Aurora fired blank shots at the Winter Palace signalling the start of the revolution. That night (9:40 PM), the Red Guards took over the Winter Palace and arrested the Provisional Government.

On 27 October 1917, Lenin proclaimed that all power now belonged to the Soviets of Workers', Soldiers' and Peasants' Deputies.

Civil War 

After Vladimir Lenin and Joseph Stalin took over the Soviet Union, many people still opposed the communist party. This led to the Civil War between the White Army and Red Army. The White Army included the opposition party, while the Red Army included the armed forces of the government and people that supported Vladimir Lenin. The Civil War resulted in the deaths of 10–30 million people.

Soviet socialism

Collapse of the Soviet Union 

In 1991, Mikhail Gorbachev removed the constitutional role of the Communist Party. Because of this it allowed non-communists to take power. As a result, Boris Yeltsin then became the first president of Russia. Russian President Boris Yeltsin would ban the CPSU in the aftermath of the failed coup attempt. The Communist Party of the Russian Federation(CPRF) would be founded at the Second Extraordinary Congress of Russian Communists on 14 February 1993 as the successor organization of the Communist Party of the Russian Soviet Federative Socialist Republic (CPRSFSR). The CPRF was the ruling party in the State Duma, the lower house of the Russian Federal Assembly from 1998 to 1999. It is the second-largest  political party in Russia after United Russia.

Modern Russia
Soviet nostalgia remains prevalent amongst the Russian populace. Per the Levada Center in 2018, 66 percent of Russians said they regretted the Soviet break-up.

Organizations

All-Union Communist Party (Bolsheviks) (1995)
All-Union Communist Party of Bolsheviks (1991)
All-Union Young Guard Bolsheviks
Alliance of the Revolutionary Socialists
Communist Party of the Russian Federation
Communist Party of the Russian Soviet Federative Socialist Republic
Communist Party of the Soviet Union
Communist Party of the Soviet Union (1992)
Communist Party of the Soviet Union (2001)
Communist Party of Social Justice
Communists of Russia
Essence of Time
Labour Russia
League of Struggle for the Emancipation of the Working Class
Left Front
Leninist Komsomol of the Russian Federation
Party of Narodnik Communists
Party of Revolutionary Communism
Party of the Dictatorship of the Proletariat
Revolutionary Workers' Party
Russian Communist Workers Party
Russian Communist Workers' Party of the Communist Party of the Soviet Union
Russian Maoist Party
Russian Socialist Movement
Russian United Labour Front
Socialist Alternative
Socialist League Vpered
Stalin Bloc – For the USSR
Union of Communist Parties – Communist Party of the Soviet Union
United Communist Party
Vanguard of Red Youth

See also

Anarchism in Russia
Bolshevism
Ideology of the Communist Party of the Soviet Union
Leninism
New Soviet man
Nostalgia for the Soviet Union
Russian Soviet Federative Socialist Republic
Soviet Union
Sovietization

References

 
History of socialism
Political history of Russia
Political movements in Russia
Political movements in the Soviet Union
Politics of Russia
Politics of the Soviet Union
Socialism in the Soviet Union